No Monkey Business is a 1935 British comedy film directed by Marcel Varnel and starring Gene Gerrard, June Clyde and Renée Houston.

Synopsis
After a music hall performer has his performing partner, an ape, confiscated by his financial creditors he persuades his assistant to dress up and impersonate the animal so that he can continue his act. However a series of embarrassments arise when they are invited to stay at a country house by a young woman who wishes to demonstrate to her father her theory that apes are as intelligent as people.

Production
The film was made by the independent company Radius Productions at the British and Dominion Studios at Elstree.

Cast

References

Bibliography
 Sutton, David R. A chorus of raspberries: British film comedy 1929–1939. University of Exeter Press, 2000.

External links

1935 films
1935 comedy films
British black-and-white films
British comedy films
1930s English-language films
Films about apes
Films about entertainers
Films directed by Marcel Varnel
Films scored by Benjamin Frankel
Films set in country houses
Films set in England
Films shot at Imperial Studios, Elstree
Films with screenplays by Joe May
1930s British films